The NBC Denis Compton Award was an annual award given to 'The Most Promising Young Player' at each of the 18 first-class counties in England and Wales. The award was made between 1996 and 2011. A player may receive the award more than once.

History

The award was born in 1996 when Neil Burns, the former Somerset wicket-keeper-batsman, and now a director of NBC Sports Management Ltd, met Denis Compton while playing for Sir Paul Getty's XI. Burns put forward his ideas for a structured programme that would see promising young English players sent for coaching in South Africa during the English winter. Compton was interested in the proposals, and after the approval of the TCCB was obtained, the first awards were made that same year.

Recipients

1996
Derbyshire – Andrew Harris
Durham – Jimmy Daley
Essex – Robert Rollins
Glamorgan – Dean Cosker
Gloucestershire – Robert Cunliffe
Hampshire – Jason Laney
Kent – Ben Phillips
Lancashire – Richard Green
Leicestershire – Iain Sutcliffe
Middlesex – Richard Johnson
Northamptonshire – David Sales
Nottinghamshire – Usman Afzaal
Somerset – Marcus Trescothick
Surrey – Ben Hollioake
Sussex – Danny Law
Warwickshire – Ashley Giles
Worcestershire – Vikram Solanki
Yorkshire – Chris Silverwood

1997
Derbyshire – Ben Spendlove
Durham – Melvyn Betts
Essex – Ashley Cowan
Glamorgan – Darren Thomas
Gloucestershire – Chris Read
Hampshire – Simon Renshaw
Kent – Ben Phillips
Lancashire – Andrew Flintoff
Leicestershire – Darren Maddy
Middlesex – Owais Shah
Northamptonshire – David Roberts
Nottinghamshire – Paul Franks
Somerset – Marcus Trescothick
Surrey – Alex Tudor
Sussex – James Kirtley
Warwickshire – Ashley Giles
Worcestershire – Reuben Spiring
Yorkshire – Paul Hutchinson

1998
Derbyshire – Kevin Dean
Durham – Steve Harmison
Essex – Stephen Peters
Glamorgan – Darren Thomas
Gloucestershire – Matt Windows
Hampshire – Alex Morris
Kent – Robert Key
Lancashire – Chris Schofield
Leicestershire – James Ormond
Middlesex – Jamie Hewitt
Northamptonshire – Graeme Swann
Nottinghamshire – Paul Franks
Somerset – Matthew Bulbeck
Surrey – Alex Tudor
Sussex – Robin Martin-Jenkins
Warwickshire – Mark Wagh
Worcestershire – Matthew Rawnsley
Yorkshire – Matthew Hoggard

1999
Derbyshire – Robin Weston
Durham – Gary Pratt
Essex – Tim Phillips
Glamorgan – Mark Wallace
Gloucestershire – Ben Gannon
Hampshire – Derek Kenway
Kent – Alex Loudon
Lancashire – Chris Schofield
Leicestershire – James Ormond
Middlesex – John Maunders
Northamptonshire – Michael Davies
Nottinghamshire – Paul Franks
Somerset – Matthew Bulbeck
Surrey – Michael Carberry
Sussex – Robin Martin-Jenkins
Warwickshire – Ian Bell
Worcestershire – Chris Liptrot
Yorkshire – Ryan Sidebottom

2000
Derbyshire – Luke Sutton
Durham – Nicky Peng
Essex – Andrew McGarry
Glamorgan – Mike Powell
Gloucestershire – Chris Taylor
Hampshire – Chris Tremlett
Kent – David Masters
Lancashire – Chris Schofield
Leicestershire – James Ormond
Middlesex – Edmund Joyce
Northamptonshire – Toby Bailey
Nottinghamshire – David Lucas
Somerset – Peter Trego
Surrey – Michael Carberry
Sussex – Robin Martin-Jenkins
Warwickshire – Ian Bell
Worcestershire – Kabir Ali
Yorkshire – Ryan Sidebottom

2001
Derbyshire – Luke Sutton
Durham – Nicky Peng
Essex – James Foster
Glamorgan – Simon Jones
Gloucestershire – Steven Pope
Hampshire – Chris Tremlett
Kent – Robert Key
Lancashire – Kyle Hogg
Leicestershire – Matthew Whiley
Middlesex – Nick Compton
Northamptonshire – Monty Panesar
Nottinghamshire – Bilal Shafayat
Somerset – Matthew Wood
Surrey – Tim Murtagh
Sussex – Matt Prior
Warwickshire – Ian Bell
Worcestershire – Kadeer Ali
Yorkshire – Richard Dawson

2002
Derbyshire – Luke Sutton
Durham – Gordon Muchall
Essex – Will Jefferson
Glamorgan – Jonathan Hughes
Gloucestershire – Alex Gidman
Hampshire – Jon Francis
Kent – Amjad Khan
Lancashire – James Anderson
Leicestershire – Luke Wright
Middlesex – Nick Compton
Northamptonshire – Robert White
Nottinghamshire – Bilal Shafayat
Somerset – Arul Suppiah
Surrey – Rikki Clarke
Sussex – Matt Prior
Warwickshire – James Troughton
Worcestershire – Kadeer Ali
Yorkshire – Tim Bresnan

2003
Derbyshire – Tom Lungley
Durham – Liam Plunkett
Essex – Alastair Cook
Glamorgan – Adam Harrison
Gloucestershire – Alex Gidman
Hampshire – James Tomlinson
Kent – James Tredwell
Lancashire – Sajid Mahmood
Leicestershire – Tom New
Middlesex – Eoin Morgan
Northamptonshire – Mark Powell
Nottinghamshire – Paul McMahon
Somerset – James Hildreth
Surrey – James Benning
Sussex – Matt Prior
Warwickshire – Graham Wagg
Worcestershire – Shaftab Khalid
Yorkshire – Tim Bresnan

2004
Derbyshire – Nick Walker
Durham – Ben Harmison
Essex – Alastair Cook
Glamorgan – David Harrison
Gloucestershire – Will Rudge
Hampshire – Mitchell Stokes
Kent – Joe Denly
Lancashire – John Simpson
Leicestershire – Tom New
Middlesex – Eoin Morgan
Northamptonshire – Graeme White
Nottinghamshire – Mark Footitt
Somerset – James Hildreth
Surrey – Jade Dernbach
Sussex – Luke Wright
Warwickshire – Moeen Ali
Worcestershire – Steven Davies
Yorkshire – Mark Lawson

2005
Derbyshire – Paul Borrington
Durham – Liam Plunkett
Essex – Alastair Cook
Glamorgan – Mike O'Shea
Gloucestershire – Steven Snell
Hampshire – Kevin Latouf
Kent – Joe Denly
Lancashire – Tom Smith
Leicestershire – Stuart Broad
Middlesex – Billy Godleman
Northamptonshire – Graeme White
Nottinghamshire – Mark Footitt
Somerset – James Hildreth
Surrey – Rory Hamilton-Brown
Sussex – Luke Wright
Warwickshire – Moeen Ali
Worcestershire – Steven Davies
Yorkshire – Greg Wood

2006
Derbyshire – Wayne White
Durham – Ben Harmison
Essex – Alastair Cook
Glamorgan – Ben Wright
Gloucestershire – Vikram Banerjee
Hampshire – Chris Benham
Kent – Joe Denly
Lancashire – Tom Smith
Leicestershire – Stuart Broad
Middlesex – Nick Compton
Northamptonshire – Mark Nelson
Nottinghamshire – Mark Footitt
Somerset – Sam Spurway
Surrey – Rory Hamilton-Brown
Sussex – Ollie Rayner
Warwickshire – Andrew Miller
Worcestershire – Steven Davies
Yorkshire – Adil Rashid

2007
Derbyshire – Paul Borrington
Durham – Graham Onions
Essex – Ravi Bopara
Glamorgan – James Harris
Gloucestershire – Matthew Gitsham
Hampshire – Liam Dawson
Kent – Joe Denly
Lancashire – Tom Smith
Leicestershire – Stuart Broad
Middlesex – Billy Godleman
Northamptonshire – Graeme White
Nottinghamshire – Samit Patel
Somerset – Craig Kieswetter
Surrey – Chris Jordan
Sussex – Luke Wright
Warwickshire – Ian Westwood
Worcestershire – Steven Davies
Yorkshire – Adil Rashid

2008
Derbyshire – John Clare
Durham – Ben Harmison
Essex – Tom Westley
Glamorgan – James Harris
Gloucestershire – William Porterfield
Hampshire – Liam Dawson
Kent – Joe Denly
Lancashire – Karl Brown
Leicestershire – Josh Cobb
Middlesex – Dawid Malan
Northamptonshire – Alex Wakely
Nottinghamshire – Alex Hales
Somerset – Craig Kieswetter
Surrey – Stuart Meaker
Sussex – Ollie Rayner
Warwickshire – Chris Woakes
Worcestershire – Steven Davies
Yorkshire – Adil Rashid

2009
Derbyshire – Dan Redfern
Durham – Scott Borthwick
Essex – Tom Westley
Glamorgan – James Harris
Gloucestershire – Ian Saxelby
Hampshire – James Vince
Kent – Sam Northeast
Lancashire – Stephen Parry
Leicestershire – James Taylor
Middlesex – Steven Finn
Northamptonshire – David Willey
Nottinghamshire – Alex Hales
Somerset – Craig Kieswetter
Surrey – Jade Dernbach
Sussex – Rory Hamilton-Brown
Warwickshire – Chris Woakes
Worcestershire – Moeen Ali
Yorkshire – Jonny Bairstow

2010
Derbyshire – Chesney Hughes
Durham – Ben Stokes
Essex – Tom Westley
Glamorgan – James Harris
Gloucestershire – David Payne
Hampshire – Danny Briggs
Kent – Sam Northeast
Lancashire – Simon Kerrigan
Leicestershire – Nathan Buck
Middlesex – Toby Roland-Jones
Northamptonshire – Rob Newton
Nottinghamshire – Alex Hales
Somerset – Jos Buttler
Surrey – Stuart Meaker
Sussex – Ben Brown
Warwickshire – Chris Woakes
Worcestershire – Alexei Kervezee
Yorkshire – Adam Lyth

2011
Derbyshire – Ross Whiteley
Durham – Ben Stokes
Essex – Reece Topley
Glamorgan – James Harris
Gloucestershire – David Payne
Hampshire – Danny Briggs
Kent – Mat Coles
Lancashire – Simon Kerrigan
Leicestershire – Nathan Buck
Middlesex – John Simpson
Northamptonshire – Alex Wakely
Nottinghamshire – Alex Hales
Somerset – Jos Buttler
Surrey – Tom Maynard
Sussex – Luke Wells
Warwickshire – Chris Woakes
Worcestershire – Alexei Kervezee
Yorkshire – Jonny Bairstow

Source: ESPNcricinfo.

References

External links
 NBC Sports Management Ltd

Cricket awards and rankings